The following is the orders, decorations, and medals given by Sultan of Perak. When applicable, post-nominal letters and non-hereditary titles are indicated. Order of precedence for the wearing of order insignias, decorations, and medals Precedence:Susunan Keutamaan Darjah Kebesaran, Bintang dan Pingat Perak

 Orders, decorations, and medals The Most Esteemed Royal Family Order of Perak - Darjah Kerabat Diraja Yang Amat Dihormati
 Founded by Sultan Yusuf Izzuddin Shah on 12 December 1957. 
 Awarded in one class only, conferred on members of the Perak and foreign Royal houses - D.K.The Most Esteemed Perak Family Order of Sultan Azlan Shah - Darjah Kerabat Sri Paduka Sultan Azlan Shah Perak Yang Amat Dihormati
 Founded by Sultan Azlan Shah in 2000. Conferred on members of the Perak and foreign Royal Houses and for distinguished services to the Sultan. 
 Awarded in two classes :
 a superior class - restricted to Royalty - Darjah Kerabat Sultan Azlan - D.K.S.A.
 an ordinary class Datuk Sri Paduka Sultan Azlan - S.P.S.A.The Most Esteemed Azlanii Royal Family Order - Darjah Yang Teramat Mulia Darjah Kerabat Azlanii
 Founded by Sultan Azlan Shah in 2009 and 2010.
 Awarded in three classes :
 Member First Class - Darjah Kerabat Azlanii  - D.K.A. I  (2010)
 Member Second Class - Darjah Kerabat Azlanii  - D.K.A. II (2010)
 Grand Knight  - Darjah Dato’ Seri Azlanii  - D.S.A.  (2009)The Most Illustrious Order of Cura Si Manja Kini (the Perak Sword of State) - Darjah Kebesaran Negeri Perak Yang Amat Mulia Cura Si Manja Kini
 Founded by Sultan Idris Shah II on 15 September 1969. 
 Awarded in three classes and the fourth class was instituted on 19 April 1989 :
 1. Grand Knight or Dato' Seri - S.P.C.M.
 2. Knight or Dato' - D.P.C.M.
 3. Commander or Paduka - P.C.M.
 4. Member or Ahli - A.C.M.The Most Valliant Order of Taming Sari (the Perak State Kris) - Darjah Kebesaran Taming Sari Negeri Perak Yang Amat Perkasa
 Founded by Sultan Idris Shah II in 1977. 
 Awarded to military and police personnel in six classes :
 1. Dato' Seri Panglima - S.P.T.S.
 2. Dato' Pahlawan - D.P.T.S.
 3. Pirwira (Paduka) - P.T.S.
 4. Hulubalang - H.T.S.
 5. Kshatriya - K.T.S.
 6. Perajurit (Ahli) - A.T.S.The Most Illustrious Order of the Perak State Crown - Darjah Kebesaran Mahkota Negeri Perak Yang Amat Mulia
 Founded by Sultan Yusuf Izzuddin Shah on 12 December 1957. 
 Awarded in four classes :
 1. Knight Grand Commander or Dato' Seri - S.P.M.P.
 2. Knight Commander or Dato' - D.P.M.P. 
 3. Commander or Paduka - P.M.P.
 4. Member or Ahli - A.M.P.Conspicuous Gallantry Medal - Pingat Keberanian Handal
 Instituted by Sultan Yusuf Izzuddin Shah on 15 January 1951 as a reward for conspicuous gallantry and heroism. 
 Awarded in a single class, originally a silver medal similar to the design of the P.P.T. but now a four-pointed enamelled star (P.K.H.). 
 Bars may be awarded to signify subsequent acts of gallantry.Distinguished Conduct Medal - Pingat Pekerti Terpilih
 Instituted by Sultan Yusuf Izzuddin Shah on 15 January 1951 to reward conspicuous bravery. 
 Awarded in a single class, bronze medal - P.P.T. 
 Bars may be awarded to signify subsequent acts of bravery.Meritorious Service Medal - Pingat Jasa Kebaktian
 Instituted by Sultan Yusuf Izzuddin Shah on 15 January 1951 to reward meritorious public service in state employ. 
 Awarded in a single class, bronze medal - P.J.K.Long Service Medal' - Pingat Lama Perkhidmatan''
 Instituted by Sultan Idris Shah II on 15 September 1969 to reward long service in state employ of at least twenty-five years continuous duration. 
 Awarded in a single class, bronze medal - P.L.P.

Timeline of ribbons

See also 

 Orders, decorations, and medals of the Malaysian states and federal territories#Perak
 List of post-nominal letters (Perak)

References 

 
Perak